Mount Salem Methodist Episcopal Church is a historic church in Alexandria Township, Hunterdon County, New Jersey, United States.

It was built in 1864 and added to the National Register of Historic Places on May 19, 1988.

See also
National Register of Historic Places listings in Hunterdon County, New Jersey

References

Methodist churches in New Jersey
Churches on the National Register of Historic Places in New Jersey
Italianate architecture in New Jersey
Churches completed in 1864
19th-century Methodist church buildings in the United States
Churches in Hunterdon County, New Jersey
National Register of Historic Places in Hunterdon County, New Jersey
New Jersey Register of Historic Places
Alexandria Township, New Jersey
Italianate church buildings in the United States